Conversion of Paul is an oil-on-panel by the Netherlandish Renaissance artist Pieter Bruegel the Elder, painted in 1567. It is currently held and exhibited at the Kunsthistorisches Museum in Vienna.

Description
Bruegel shows Paul's army on its way to Damascus in contemporary dress and with 16th century armour and weapons. The saint himself is in a blue doublet and hose of the painter's day. Bruegel, having lived in Italy, was not unfamiliar with classical dress: his intention in representing biblical scenes in contemporary dress was to stress their relevance to his own time. In view of the persecution and counter-persecution of the Reformation and Counter-Reformation, the story of Paul's conversion had special significance.  The events are described in The Acts of the Apostles 9, 3-7:

Bruegel is not only illustrating the biblical text; he is also stressing the need for faith and condemning the sin of pride.

Details

This work was acquired by Archduke Ernest of Austria in 1594, subsequently passing into the imperial collections with Rudolf II, Holy Roman Emperor. Some critics have suggested that the scene depicted by Bruegel refers to contemporaneous events, especially the crossing of the Alps by Don Fernando Álvarez de Toledo y Pimentel, 3rd Duke of Alba in 1567, as he was marching into the Netherlands at the head of an army of 10,000 men to sedate the Dutch revolts.

More probably, Bruegel's depiction of Paul's conversion taking place high up on a pine-clad mountain pass may have been suggested by an engraving of 1509 by Lucas van Leyden. As in The Procession to Calvary and the Preaching of John the Baptist, Bruegel places the principal figures in the middle distance, almost lost amongst a mass of small figures and behind the eye-catching foreground soldiers and horsemen, who are incidental to the telling of the story. This is a familiar mannerist device which is intended to tease the spectator and draw his eye deep into the picture space in search of the principal subject.

References

External links

The Conversion of Paul at the KHM (German)
Kunsthistorisches Museum's Official Website
Bosch Bruegel Society
99 works by Pieter Bruegel the Elder
 Creative Bruegel laid the foundation of the Netherlands School (Russian)

1567 paintings
Paintings by Pieter Bruegel the Elder
Paintings in the collection of the Kunsthistorisches Museum
Bruegel
Horses in art